The Dean of Clogher is a dignitary of the Diocese of Clogher within the Church of Ireland. The title may be held by any licensed incumbent in the diocese, not necessarily the rector of one of the cathedral parishes of Clogher. The Dean, with the Cathedral chapter, has responsibility for the cathedral life of St Macartan's, Clogher and St Macartin's, Enniskillen.

The current incumbent is Kenny Hall, rector of Enniskillen.

Deans of Clogher

 1606 Robert Openshawe (afterwards Dean of Connor) 
 1617 Robert Barclay or Berkeley
 1660/1–1667 John Hodson (afterwards Bishop of Elphin, 1667)  
 1667–1675 John Roan (afterwards Bishop of Killaloe, 1675) 
 1675–1682 Richard Tennison (afterwards Bishop of Killala, 1682 and Bishop of Meath, 1697) 
 1682–1716 Joseph Williams
 1716–1724 William Gore (afterwards Dean of Down, 1724)
 1724–1727 Jonathan Smedley
 1727/8–1730 Pascal (or Paul) Ducasse
 1730 Edward Cresset
 1737/8–1743 John Copping
 1743–1761 William Langton
 1761–1763 Edward Young (afterwards Bishop of Dromore, 1763) 
 1763–1781 Richard Woodward (afterwards Bishop of Cloyne, 1781) 
 1781–1799 Cadogan Keatinge
 1799–1805 John Beresford (afterwards Bishop of Cork and Ross, 1805) 
 1805–1825 Richard Bagwell
 1826–1861 Robert Maude
 1862–1873 Ogle Moore
 1873–1899 Thomas Le Ban Kennedy
 1900–1903 George Tottenham
 1903–1911 Charles Thomas Ovenden (afterwards Dean of St Patrick's Cathedral, 1911)
 1911–1932 Arthur Newburgh Haire-Forster
 1932–1950 Hubert MacManaway
 1950–1958 Robert McTighe
 1959–1962 William Morris
 1962–1966 Robert Mollan
 1966–1982 Thomas Clements
 1982–1984 John McNutt
 1985–1986 Brian Hannon (afterwards Bishop of Clogher, 1986)
 1986–1989 Nevil O'Neill
 1989–1994 John McCarthy
 1995–2004 Thomas Moore
 2005–2009 Raymond Thompson
 2009–present Kenny Hall

References

 
Diocese of Clogher (Church of Ireland)
Clogher